Brian Albert Chippendale (born 29 October 1964) is an English former professional footballer. He played as a winger.

1964 births
Living people
Bradford City A.F.C. players
York City F.C. players
Halifax Town A.F.C. players
Burnley F.C. players
Preston North End F.C. players
English Football League players
Association football midfielders
English footballers